Land mobile service (short: LMS) is – in line to ITU Radio Regulations – a mobile service between base stations and land mobile stations, or between land mobile stations.

In accordance with ITU Radio Regulations (article 1) variations of this radiocommunication service are classified as follows:
Mobile service (article 1.24)
Land mobile service (article 1.26)
Land mobile-satellite service (article 1.27)

Frequency allocation
The allocation of radio frequencies is provided according to Article 5 of the ITU Radio Regulations (edition 2012).

In order to improve harmonisation in spectrum utilisation, the majority of service-allocations stipulated in this document were incorporated in national Tables of Frequency Allocations and Utilisations which is with-in the responsibility of the appropriate national administration. The allocation might be primary, secondary, exclusive, and shared.
primary allocation:  is indicated by writing in capital letters
secondary allocation: is indicated by small letters (see example below)
exclusive or shared utilization: is within the responsibility of administrations
However, military usage, in bands where there is civil usage, will be in accordance with the ITU Radio Regulations. In NATO countries military land mobile utilizations will be in accordance with the NATO Joint Civil/Military Frequency Agreement (NJFA).

FCC LMR Narrowbanding Mandate
LMR Narrowbanding is the result of an FCC Order issued in December 2004 mandating that all CFR 47 Part 90 business, educational, industrial, public safety, and state and local government  VHF (150-174 MHz) and UHF (421-470 MHz) Private Land Mobile Radio (PLMR) licensees operating legacy wideband (25 kHz bandwidth) voice or data/SCADA systems to migrate to narrowband (12.5 kHz bandwidth or equivalent) systems by January 1, 2013.

See also
 Business Radio Service
 Land mobile radio system
 Narrowband
 Forest Industries Telecommunications
 Radio station
 Radiocommunication service

References

External links
 FCC: Public Safety Radio Service
 FCC: Industrial/Business Radio Service
 FCC: Private Land Mobile Radio
  Narrowbanding Information, Updates, and Licensee Resources

Mobile services ITU